The 2017 Big Ten Conference men's soccer season was the 27th season of men's varsity soccer in the conference. The season began on August 25, 2017 and concluded on November 5, 2017. The season culminated with the 2017 Big Ten Conference Men's Soccer Tournament to determine the conference's automatic berth into the 2017 NCAA Division I Men's Soccer Tournament.

The Maryland Terrapins entered the 2017 season as both the Big Ten regular season and tournament defending champions. Maryland was unable to defend either title, heavily due to a late season slump in form, that culminated with a double overtime loss to Michigan. Wisconsin won their first Big Ten Tournament since 1995, defeating Indiana in the championship in penalties. The Michigan Wolverines posted a 6–1–1 Big Ten record, giving the Wolverines their first ever Big Ten regular season title, besting Indiana on points.

The Big Ten sent five teams to the NCAA Tournament, three being seeded (Indiana, Michigan and Michigan State), and three unseeded (Maryland and Wisconsin). Indiana advanced the furthest of all the Big Ten teams, reaching the 2017 NCAA Division I Men's Soccer Championship Game, before losing in overtime to Stanford.

Background

Head coaches

Preseason

Recruiting

Preseason poll 

The preseason poll was released on August 16.

Regular season

Results

Rankings

United Soccer Coaches National

United Soccer Coaches Midwest Regional

Postseason

Big Ten Tournament

NCAA Tournament

Awards

MLS SuperDraft

Total picks by school

List of selections

Homegrown contracts

See also 

 Big Ten Conference
 2017 Big Ten Conference Men's Soccer Tournament
 2017 NCAA Division I men's soccer season
 2017 in American soccer

References 

 
2017 NCAA Division I men's soccer season
2017